This is the list of members elected in the 1999 Constituent National Assembly of Venezuela.

Presidency 
 Luis Miquilena (President)
 Isaías Rodríguez (First Vice President)
 Aristóbulo Istúriz (Second Vice President)

Secretaries 
 Elvis Amoroso
 Alejandro Andrade

Constituent Members

National 
 Claudio Fermín
 Alfredo Peña
 
 Angela Zago
 Earle Herrera
 
 Eustoquio Contreras
 
 Hermann Escarrá
 Jesús Rafael Sulbarán
 Leopoldo Pucho
 Luis Vallenilla
 Manuel Quijada
 Marisabel de Chávez
 Pablo Medina
 
 Reyna Romero García
 
 Tarek William Saab
 Vinicio Romero Martínez

Capital District 
 Desirée Santos Amaral
 Eliézer Reinaldo Otaiza Castillo
 Ernesto Alvarenga
 Freddy Alirio Bernal Rosales
 Julio César Alviárez
 Nicolás Maduro Moros
 Segundo Meléndez
 Vladimir Villegas

Amazonas 
 Liborio Guarulla
 Nelson Silva

Anzoátegui 
 Ángel Rodríguez
 David de Lima Salas
 David Figueroa
 Elías López Portillo

Apure 
 Cristóbal Jiménez
 Rafael Rodríguez Fernández

Aragua 
 Alberto Jordán Hernández
 Antonio di Giampaolo Bottini
 Carlos Tablante
 Humberto Prieto
 Oscar Feo

Barinas

Bolívar 
 Alejandro de Jesús Silva Marcano
 Antonio Briceño
 Daniel Díaz
 Leonel Jiménez Carupe
 Victoria Mata

Carabobo 
 
 Manuel Vadell Graterol
 Américo Díaz Núñez
 Blancanieve Portocarrero
 Diego Salazar
 Francisco Ameliach
 Juan José Marín Laya
 Oscar Navar Tortolero

Cojedes 
 Haydée de Franco
 Juan Bautista Pérez

Delta Amacuro 
 César Pérez Marcano
 Ramón Antonio Yánez

Falcón 
 
  Sol Musset de Primera

Guárico 
 Ángel Eugenio Landaeta
 Pedro Solano Persomo
 Ruben Alfredo Ávila Ávila

Lara 
 Antonio José García García
 Enrique Peraza
 Henri Falcón
 Lenín Romero
 
 Mirna Teresa Vies de Álvarez
 Reinaldo Rojas

Mérida 
 Adán Chávez Frías
 Florencio Antonio Porras Echezuría
 Pausides Segundo Reyes Gómez

Miranda 
 Elías Jaua
 Freddy Gutiérrez
 Haydeé Machín
 José Gregorio Vielma Mora
 José Vicente Rangel
 Luis Camargo
 Miguel Madriz
 Raúl Esté
 Rodolfo Sanz
 Willian Lara

Monagas 
 José Gregorio Briceño
 Marelis Pérez Marcano
 Numa Rojas Velásquez

Nueva Esparta 
 Alexis Navarro Rojas
 Virgilio Ávila Vivas

Portuguesa 
 Antonia Muñoz
 Miguel Garranchán Velásquez

Sucre 
 Jesús Molina Villegas
 José Luis Meza
 Luis Augusto Acuña Cedeño

Táchira 
 Iris Varela
 Ronald Blanco La Cruz
 Samuel López
 Temístocles Salazar

Trujillo 
 Gerardo Márquez
 Gilmer Viloria

Vargas 
 Antonio Rodríguez
 Jaime Barrios

Yaracuy 
 Braulio Álvarez
Néstor León Heredia

Zulia 
 Alberto Urdaneta
 Atala Uriana
 Froilán Barrios Nieves
 Gastón Parra Luzardo
 Geovanny Darío Finol Fernández
 Ildefonso Finol
 Jorge Luis Durán Centeno
 Levy Arrón Alter Valero
 María de Queipo
 Mario Isea Bohórquez
 Rafael Colmenárez
 Roberto Jiménez Maggiolo
 Silvestre Villalobos

Indigenous communities 
 Guillermo Guevara
 José Luis González

See also 
 Members of the 2017 National Constituent Assembly of Venezuela
 1999 Constituent National Assembly

References 

Venezuela politics-related lists